Azan bin Ismail (born 10 May 1965) is a Malaysian politician. He is a former Terengganu State Assemblyman for Bandar from 2013 to 2018 and Member of Parliament for the Indera Mahkota constituency in Pahang from 2008 to 2013. He is a member of the People's Justice Party (PKR) in the Pakatan Harapan (PH) coalition.

Azan was elected to Parliament in the 2008 general election, defeating Salamon Ali Rizal Abdul Rahman of the governing Barisan Nasional (BN) coalition by 1,027 votes. He was a member of PKR's leadership in Pahang before resigning in 2010, citing dissatisfaction with PKR's management. He subsequently became the leader of PKR in the neighbouring state of Terengganu, and was elected to the State Assembly there, for the seat of Bandar, in 2013 general election. His election unseated the incumbent BN assemblyman, Toh Chin Yaw, and was part of a swing to Pakatan Rakyat in the state that saw them win 15 of 32 assembly seats. Azan's move to Terengganu was carried out at the direction of PKR's national leader Anwar Ibrahim and involved Azan relinquishing renomination for his federal parliamentary seat.

In the 2018 general election, Azan failed to retain the Bandar state seat after he lost to Ahmad Shah Mohamed, from the Pan-Malaysian Islamic Party (PAS), in a three-corner fight with Toh Seng Cheng from Malaysian Chinese Association (MCA) of BN.

Election results

References

1965 births
Living people
People from Terengganu
Malaysian people of Malay descent
Malaysian Muslims
People's Justice Party (Malaysia) politicians
Members of the Dewan Rakyat
Members of the Terengganu State Legislative Assembly